GRT Grand Chennai is a Luxury hotel located at T. Nagar, Chennai, India. It is owned by G.R. Thanga Maligai (P) Ltd, a jewellery organisation based in the city.

The hotel
The hotel has 9 floors with 133 rooms, including 6 suites. Food and beverage sections in the hotel include Any Time, a 24-hr multi-cuisine restaurant; Copper Point, an Indian fine-dining restaurant on the ground floor; Azulia, a Mediterranean restaurant; and High Time, a three-level bar. There is also a coffee shop on the ground floor. The hotel has about 8,200 sq ft of banquet space with a total seating capacity of about 750 persons, including a 2,850 sq ft Southern Crown hall with a seating capacity of 250 persons, a 3,333 sq ft Marigold hall with a seating capacity of 350 persons and a 2,000 sq ft Gulmohar hall with a seating capacity of 150 persons.

In December 2001, the hotel was awarded the ISO 9001:2000 certification.

See also

 Hotels in Chennai

References

External links
 Homepage of GRT Grand Chennai

Hotels in Chennai
Hotels established in 1999
1999 establishments in Tamil Nadu